KZJM-LP (92.7 FM) is an American low-power FM radio station broadcasting to the Lafayette, Louisiana, area. The station airs an urban contemporary music format.

External links
 

Urban contemporary radio stations in the United States
Radio stations established in 2005
Radio stations in Louisiana